Ahmed Ben Soueid (born in Benghazi) is a Libyan professional football player and manager.

Career
A native of Benghazi, Ben Soueid is one of the best players in the history of Libyan football. Having played his entire career with the team Al-Ahly SC (Benghazi), it is famous for the club in the 1960s with whom he became the top scorer in its history. During the 1963-1964 and 1964-1965 seasons, he was elected best scorer of the national championship with 19 and 18 goals.

Ben Soueid scored 36 goals for the national team and holds the Libyan record for the most goals in a game, 9, which he hit against Oman in the 1966 Arab Nations Cup.

In 1989, he coached the Libya national football team.

References

Living people
Libyan footballers
Association football forwards
Libyan football managers
Libya national football team managers
Association football defenders
People from Benghazi
1946 births